The 2013 Segunda División play-offs took place in June 2013. The Segunda División promotion phase (known as Promoción de ascenso) was the second phase of 2012–13 Segunda División and was to determine the third team which promoted to 2013–14 La Liga. Teams placed between third and sixth position (excluding reserve teams) took part in the promotion play-offs.

Regulations were the same that previous season: the fifth placed faced the fourth, while the sixth positioned team faced the third. In case of an eliminatory competition tie, extra time would be played but there would not be a penalty shoot-out; the winner would be the best positioned team. The first leg of the semi-finals were played on 12 June, and the second leg on 15 June at home of the best positioned team. The final was also be two-legged, with the first leg on 19 June and the second leg on 22 June, with the best positioned team also playing at home the second leg. Almería and Girona played the final phase where Almería was winner and promoted to La Liga after two years of absence. Alcorcón and Las Palmas were eliminated in semi-finals.

Road to the play-offs

League table

Almería
Almería qualified for this phase on the last matchday after failing to secure promotion to La Liga directly after they lost 1–0 at El Madrigal in the decisive last match was against the already promoted Villarreal.

Almería's last participation in La Liga was in 2010–11. The club had spent four seasons in a row in the top division, where they debuted in 2006–07. It ranked 41st in the all-time La Liga table. This was the second season in the second division since their relegation in 2011.

Background at 2012–13 Segunda División:

Girona
Girona was the only known team to qualify for the play-offs before the last matchday, assuring fourth place in the 41st round. They made a spectacular performance and spent all season in promotion places, some of them in direct promotion.

Girona had never been in La Liga. This was the fifth season in the second division since their return in 2008–09 after 50 years in lower categories.

Background at 2012–13 Segunda División:

Alcorcón
Alcorcón was one of the teams which they spent almost all season in promotion places, most of them in the play-offs zone, but they qualified for this phase in the last matchday. They were fighting together with Las Palmas and Ponferradina for the remaining two places (fifth and sixth) for play-offs, and eventually repeated the play-off appearance from the previous season. 

Alcorcón had never been in La Liga. This was the third season in the second division since their debut in 2010–11.

Background at 2012–13 Segunda División:

Las Palmas
Las Palmas made a regular season and was in play-offs zone in the last part of the season.

Las Palmas last participation in La Liga was in 2001–02. Las Palmas spent 31 seasons in the top division: the first in 1951–52, and from 1954–88 except periods 1960–64 and 1983–85, and lately from 2000–02. It ranked 19th in the all-time La Liga table. They were in the category since 2006–07.

Background at 2012–13 Segunda División:

Promotion play-offs

Semifinals

First leg

Second leg

Final

First leg

Second leg

References

2012-13
play-offs
1